In seismology, the depth of focus or focal depth refers to the depth at which an earthquake occurs.

The cause of deep-focus earthquakes is still not entirely understood since subducted lithosphere at that pressure and temperature regime should not exhibit brittle behavior. A possible mechanism for the generation of deep-focus earthquakes is faulting caused by olivine undergoing a phase transition into a spinel structure, with which they are believed to be associated. Earthquakes at this depth of focus typically occur at oceanic-continental convergent boundaries, along Wadati–Benioff zones.

Discovery

The evidence for deep-focus earthquakes was discovered in 1922 by H.H. Turner of Oxford, England. Previously, all earthquakes were considered to have shallow focal depths. The existence of deep-focus earthquakes was confirmed in 1931 from studies of the seismograms of several earthquakes, which in turn led to the construction of travel-time curves for intermediate and deep earthquakes.

See also
Asthenosphere
Lithosphere

References

Plate tectonics
Types of earthquake